Yegor Alekseyevich Rudkovsky (born 4 March 1996) is a Russian football player. He plays for FC Chertanovo Moscow.

Club career
He made his professional debut in the Russian Professional Football League for FC Chertanovo Moscow on 22 August 2014 in a game against FC Arsenal-2 Tula.

He made his Russian Football National League debut for FC Spartak-2 Moscow on 16 July 2016 in a game against FC Mordovia Saransk.

International
He won the 2013 UEFA European Under-17 Championship with Russia.

References

External links
 
 
 
 

1996 births
Sportspeople from Omsk
Living people
Russian footballers
Association football midfielders
Russia youth international footballers
Russia under-21 international footballers
FC Kuban Krasnodar players
FC Spartak-2 Moscow players
FC Chertanovo Moscow players